USS Daniel (DE-335) was an Edsall-class destroyer escort in service with the United States Navy from 1944 to 1946. She was scrapped in 1974.

Namesake

Hugh Spencer Daniel was born on 26 December 1923 in Chattanooga, Tennessee. He enlisted in the Marine Corps Reserve 9 June 1941. Joining  on 19 October 1941, he remained on board that ship until his death in the Battle of the Santa Cruz Islands on 26 October 1942. He was posthumously awarded the Navy Cross for his heroism in refusing to leave his gunnery station although wounded during this battle.

Construction and commissioning
Daniel was launched 16 November 1943 by Consolidated Steel Corp., Orange, Texas; sponsored by Mrs. C. E. Daniel; and commissioned 24 January 1944.

Atlantic Ocean Convoy Duty 
 
Sailing from Galveston, Texas, 11 February 1944, Daniel conducted shakedown training at Bermuda en route to Norfolk, Virginia, where she arrived 24 March. She was assigned to duty as school ship training destroyer escort nucleus crews in Hampton Roads, Virginia, until 31 May. After escorting a tug to Bermuda she reported for convoy duty.
 
Between 27 June and 27 September 1944 Daniel escorted two convoys to Naples, Italy, then made five escort voyages to ports in England and France between 23 October 1944 and 3 June 1945.

Pacific Theatre operations
 
Daniel arrived at San Diego, California, 29 July, and 4 days later got underway for Pearl Harbor. Arriving 9 August, she conducted exercises and served as plane guard for  during pilot qualification landings.

Decommissioning and fate

On 5 September she sailed for the east coast, arriving at Philadelphia 27 September. She was placed out of commission in reserve at Green Cove Springs, Florida, 12 April 1946.

References

External links

 Navsosurce.org - USS Daniel (DE-335)
 USS Daniel (DE-335) - Unit Pages
 Destroyers Online - The Edsall-class 
 uboat.net - Allied Warships - Edsall-class destroyer escort

Edsall-class destroyer escorts
World War II frigates and destroyer escorts of the United States
Ships built in Orange, Texas
1943 ships